is an original Japanese net anime series produced by Wit Studio. Originally set for a 2021 premiere on Netflix, the series was delayed to May 16, 2022.

Characters

A human teenager and trainee soldier who struggles with the constant war between humans and vampires. Meeting the Queen of the Vampires on the battlefield she embarks on a journey where she learns to love life and experience music for the first time. 

Queen of the Vampires who resists her role as Queen and wishes the war would end. Having lost the human love of her life, Aria, to the war she often wishes to die. Meeting a young human who resembles Aria she fosters her growing love for music and leaves the war behind as she learns to live again.

Fine's childhood friend and loyal servant. He despises humans as he knows a human was the cause of Fine's heartbreak and does everything he can to try make her happy and bring her home when she leaves. 

Momo's mother and General of the human army. She has shown she loves Momo but prioritises her position as General over motherhood, even willing to charge Momo with treason to suit her political goals. 

Nobara's brother and uncle to Momo. Also a General in the army he prefers fighting to politics and wields a katana in battle. His hatred of vampires runs deep as the woman he loved was turned into a vampire and he was forced to kill her. He is fond of Momo and criticises Nobara for being a bad mother to her.

Production and release
The series was first announced back in March 2019 by Netflix, with Wit Studio handling the series' production. Ryōtarō Makihara served as director with assistance from Hiroyuki Tanaka. Tetsuyo Nishio designed the characters and Shunichiro Yoshihara served as art director for the series. Yoshihiro Ike served as the series' composer. Vampire in the Garden was released worldwide on May 16, 2022, on Netflix.

Episode list

References

External links

2022 anime ONAs
Anime with original screenplays
Dark fantasy anime and manga
Japanese-language Netflix original programming
LGBT in anime and manga
Netflix original anime
Vampires in anime and manga
Wit Studio